Social threefolding is a social theory which originated in the early 20th century from the work of Rudolf Steiner. Of central importance is a distinction made between three spheres of society – the political, economic, and cultural.
The conviction here is that when economy, culture, and polity are relatively independent of one another, they check, balance, and correct one another and thus lead to greater social health and progress. This should not be confused with laissez-faire economics, however. Steiner was concerned rather that businesses should not be able to buy favorable laws and regulations, and that governments should regulate the economy and protections for workers impartially and not be corrupted by participating in business. “A sphere of life calls forth interests arising only within that sphere. Out of the economic sphere one can develop only economic interests. If one is called out of this sphere to produce legal judgements as well, then these will merely be economic interests in disguise.”. Social threefolding aims to foster:

equality and democracy in political life,
freedom in cultural life (art, science, religion, education, the media), and
uncoerced cooperation in a freely contractual economic life.

In 1917, during the First World War, Steiner first proposed what he often called the "threefoldment of the social organism." Then in 1919, during the German Revolution following the end of the war, Steiner was asked by several colleagues to lead and did lead a public campaign for threefold social ideas. In 1922, he gave a series of lectures on economics from the threefoldment perspective.  

Steiner suggested the cooperative independence of these three societal realms could be achieved both through relatively gradual, small-scale changes in individual enterprises, as well as by relatively rapid medium- and large-scale changes in whole economic regions or even in whole societies. Steiner insisted that large-scale changes could only be implemented if accepted by the will of the majority in society, i.e., democratically.

Steiner rejected all ideology, characterizing it as a restriction and imposition on what lives in people. 

Instead, Steiner sought to create conditions whereby people themselves could act creatively within the economy (through what he called associations, as well as through what today is sometimes called steward-owned business and stakeholder capitalism), within politics (through more participatory forms of direct democracy), and within culture (through the autonomy of teachers and other cultural workers). “All ideal programs are to be dismissed, all prescriptions are to be dismissed, everything is placed into the immediate impulse of the individual ability.”

Steiner described how the three spheres had been growing independent over thousands of years, evolving from ancient theocracies which governed all aspects of society; then, gradually separating out the purely political and legal life (beginning in Ancient Greece and Rome); then again, the purely economic life (beginning with the Industrial Revolution). 

Steiner saw this trend as evolving towards greater independence of the three spheres in modern times.  However now this evolution must be taken up with conscious intention by society.

Steiner held it socially destructive when one of the three spheres tries to dominate the others.  For example:
- "Theocracy" occurs when a cultural impulse dominates economy and politics; 
- Unregulated and socially irresponsible capitalism allows economic interests to dominate politics and culture; and
- State socialism means political agendas dominate culture and economic life.  

A more specific example: Arthur Salter, 1st Baron Salter suggests governments frequently fail when they begin to give “discretionary, particularly preferential privileges to competitive industry [hence fascism].” The goal is for this independence to arise in such a way these three realms mutually balance each other, providing healthy cultural equilibrium.

Many concrete reform proposals to advance a “threefold social order” at various scales have been advanced since 1919. Some intentionally cooperative businesses and organizations, mostly in Europe, have attempted to realize a balance between the three spheres, given existing local structures.  Waldorf schools deserve special mention in this regard. Another application has been the creation of various socially responsible banks and foundations. Bernard Lievegoed incorporated significant aspects of social threefolding in his work on organizational development.

Historical origins

Prior to the end of World War I, Steiner spoke increasingly often of the dangerous tensions inherent in the contemporary societal structures and political entanglements. He suggested a collapse of traditional social forms was imminent, and every aspect of society would soon have to be built up consciously rather than relying on the inheritance of past traditions and institutions. After the war, he saw a unique opportunity to establish a healthy social and political constitution and began lecturing throughout post-war Germany, often to large audiences, about his social ideas. These were taken up by a number of prominent cultural and political leaders of the time, but did not succeed in affecting the reconstitution of Germany taking place at the time.

After the failure of this political initiative, Steiner ceased lecturing on the subject, except for a series of economics lectures given in 1922. The impulse continued to be active in other ways, however, in particular through economic initiatives intended to provide support for non-governmental cultural organizations. Banks, such as: 
the GLS Gemeinschaftsbank (Community Bank) in Bochum, Germany,
Triodos Bank in the United Kingdom, the Netherlands and Belgium,
RSF Social Finance in the United States,

all were later founded to provide loans (and sometimes grants) to socially relevant and ethically responsible initiatives. Steiner himself saw the continuation of this impulse in the Waldorf schools, the first of which also opened in 1919. RSF Social Finance has also played a role in support of B Lab, the non-profit corporation that has developed third-party standards by which thousands of businesses have become socially responsible in a way that is independently verified.   RSF Social Finance also played a major role in the creation of a steward-ownership structure for one of the largest independent organic produce distributors in the U.S.

Three realms of society

Steiner distinguished three realms of society:
 the economy;
 politics, law, and human rights; and
 cultural institutions, including science, education, arts, religion, and media.

Steiner suggested the three would only become mutually corrective and function together in a healthy way when each was granted sufficient independence. Steiner argued that increased autonomy for the three spheres would not eliminate their mutual influence, but would cause that influence to be exerted in a more healthy and legitimate manner, because the increased separation would prevent any one of the three spheres from dominating the others, as they had frequently done in the past. Among the various kinds of macrosocial imbalance Steiner observed, there were three major types:

 Theocracy, in which the cultural sphere (in the form of a religious impulse) dominates the economic and political spheres.
 State Communism and state socialism, in which the state (political sphere) dominates the economic and cultural spheres.
 Traditional forms of capitalism, in which the economic sphere dominates the cultural and political spheres.

Steiner related the French Revolution's slogan, Liberty, Equality, Fraternity, to the three social spheres as follows:
Liberty in cultural life (education, science, art, religion, and the press),
Equality of rights, democracy, in political life, and
Cooperation in a decentralized, freely contractual, economic life outside the state and operating within the legal and regulatory boundaries, including labor laws, set by the democratic state. Economic “cooperation,” for Steiner, did not mean state socialism, but cooperative types of capitalism, such as are sometimes referred to today as steward ownership and stakeholder capitalism.

According to Steiner, those three values, each one applied to its proper social realm, would tend to keep the cultural, economic, and political realms from merging unjustly, and allow these realms and their respective values to check, balance and correct one another. The result would be a society-wide separation of powers.

Separation between the state and cultural life

Examples: 
A government should not be able to control culture; i.e., how people think, learn, or worship. A particular religion or ideology should not control the levers of the State. Steiner held that pluralism and freedom were the ideal for education and cultural life. Concerning children, Steiner held that all families, not just those with economic means, should be enabled to choose among a wide variety of independent, non-government schools from kindergarten through high school.

Separation between the economy and cultural life
Examples: 
The fact that places of worship do not make the ability to enter and participate depend on the ability to pay, and that libraries and some museums are open to all free of charge, is in tune with Steiner's notion of a separation between cultural and economic life. Efforts to protect scientific research results from commercial manipulation are also in tune with the idea. In a similar spirit, Steiner held that all families, not just those with the economic means, should have freedom of choice in education and access to independent, non-government schools for their children.

Separation between the state and the economy

Examples: 
People and businesses should be prevented from buying politicians and laws. A politician shouldn't be able to parlay his political position into riches earned by doing favors for businessmen. Slavery is unjust, because it takes something political, a person's inalienable rights, and absorbs them into the economic process of buying and selling. Steiner said, “In the old days, there were slaves. The entire man was sold as commodity... Today, capitalism is the power through which still a remnant of the human being—his labor power—is stamped with the character of a commodity.” Yet Steiner held that the solution that state socialism gives to this problem only makes it worse.

Cooperative economic life

Steiner advocated cooperative forms of capitalism, or what today is sometimes called steward ownership and stakeholder capitalism, because he thought that conventional shareholder capitalism and state socialism, though in different ways, tend to absorb the State and human rights into the economic process and transform laws into mere commodities. Steiner rejected state socialism because of that, but also because he believed it reduces the vitality of the economic process. Yet Steiner disagrees with the kind of libertarian view that holds that the State and the economy are kept apart when there is absolute economic competition. According to Steiner's view, under absolute competition, the most dominant economic forces tend to corrupt and take over the State, in that respect merging State and economy. Second, the State tends to fight back counter-productively under such circumstances by increasingly taking over the economy and merging with it, in a mostly doomed attempt to ameliorate the sense of injustice that emerges when special economic interests take over the State.

By contrast, Steiner held that uncoerced, freely self-organizing forms of cooperative economic life, in a society where there is freedom of speech, of culture, and of religion, will 1) make State intervention in the economy less necessary or called for, and 2) will tend to permit economic interests of a broader, more public-spirited sort to play a greater role in relations extending from the economy to the State.  Those two changes would keep State and economy apart more than could absolute economic competition in which economic special interests corrupt the State and make it too often resemble a mere appendage of the economy. In Steiner's view, the latter corruption leads in turn to a pendulum swing in the opposite direction: government forces, sometimes with the best of intentions, seek to turn the economy increasingly into a mere appendage of the State. State and economy thus merge through an endless iteration of pendulum swings from one to the other, increasingly becoming corrupt appendages of each other.

Steiner held that State and economy, given increased separateness through a self-organizing and voluntarily more cooperative economic life, can increasingly check, balance, and correct each other for the sake of continual human progress. In Steiner's view, the place of the State, vis-a-vis the self-organizing, cooperative economy, is not to own the economy or run it, but to regulate/deregulate it, enforce laws, and protect human rights as determined by the state's open democratic process. Steiner emphasized that none of these proposals would be successful unless the cultural sphere of society maintained and increased its own freedom and autonomy vis-a-vis economic and State power. Nothing would work without spiritual, cultural, and educational freedom.

Economic support for culture

A central idea in social threefolding is that the economic sphere should donate funds to support cultural and educational institutions that are independent of the State. As businesses become profitable through the exercise of creativity and inspiration, and a society's culture is a key source of its creativity and inspiration, returning a portion of the profits made by business to independent cultural initiatives can act as a kind of seed money to stimulate further creative growth.

In this view, taxes sometimes serve as an unhealthy form of forced donation which artificially redirect businesses' profits. Since taxes are controlled by the state, cultural initiatives supported by taxes readily fall under government control, rather than retaining their independence. Steiner believed in educational freedom and choice, and one of his ideals was that the economic sector might eventually create scholarship funds that would permit all families to choose freely from (and set up) a wide variety of independent, non-government schools for their children.

Education's relation to the state and the economy
For Steiner, separation of the cultural sphere from the political and economic spheres meant education should be available to all children regardless of the ability of families to pay for it and, from kindergarten through high school, should be provided for by private and|or state scholarships that a family could direct to the school of its choice. Steiner was a supporter of educational freedom, but was flexible, and understood that a few legal restrictions on schools (such as health and safety laws), provided they were kept to an absolute minimum, would be necessary and justified.

Civil society
Institutions of civil society—non-profits that for the most part are independent of both the State and the economic life—are globally on the rise. See also this. And this. There has been a debate among students of Steiner's sociology whether this means the cultural realm as Steiner understood it is developing greater independence from governmental and economic institutions. Nicanor Perlas has argued in the affirmative.  Gary Lamb has argued otherwise.

Politicians working out of a threefold social vision
Nicanor Perlas, winner of the Right Livelihood Award, in 2009 announced candidacy for the presidency of the Philippines. Perlas has written extensively about social threefolding.

A number of reform movements whose leaders and members may never have heard of social threefolding or Rudolf Steiner still unintentionally advance one or another of its three aspects, for example movements seeking to 1) reduce the influence of money in politics by increasing governmental transparency, 2) develop cooperative and socially responsible forms of capitalism (for example,  here: and here:), and 3) make it possible for all families, including poor ones, to have educational freedom and the right to choose among independent, non-government schools for their children (for example, here).

References

Works by Rudolf Steiner
Rudolf Steiner,   Toward Social Renewal: Basic Issues of the Social Question, Steiner's central book on social questions.
Rudolf Steiner,  World Economy: The Formation of a Science of World-Economics: fourteen lectures given in Dornach, 24 July-6 August 1922', Rudolf Steiner Press, 1972, 
Rudolf Steiner,  The Social Future (lecture series), Anthroposophic Press, 1972, 
 Three Lectures by Rudolf Steiner on Social Threefolding

Works by others
Christopher Houghton Budd, The Right-On Corporation
Christopher Houghton Budd, Freeing the Circling Stars: Pre-Funded Education
Christopher Houghton Budd, Finance at the Threshold
Travis Henry, Solving Burning Conflicts through the Separation of Culture and State
Gary Lamb, The Social Mission of Waldorf Education: Independent, Privately Funded, Accessible to All
Gary Lamb and Sarah Hearn, Steinerian Economics: A Compendium
Gary Lamb, Associative Economics: Spiritual Activity for the Common Good
Martin Large, editor, Free, Equal, and Mutual: Rebalancing Society for the Common Good (a 2018 anthology by various authors)
Martin Large, Common Wealth: For a free, equal, mutual and sustainable society
Richard Masters, Rudolf Steiner and Social Reform: Threefolding and Other Proposals
Nicanor Perlas, Shaping Globalization: Civil Society, Cultural Power and Threefolding
Guido Giacomo Preparata (de), "Perishable Money in a Threefold Commonwealth: Rudolf Steiner and the Social Economics of an Anarchist Utopia". Review of Radical Political Economics 38/4 (Fall 2006). pp. 619–648
Johannes Rohen, Functional Threefoldness in the Human Organism & Human Society
Albert Schmelzer, The Threefolding Movement, 1919, A History: Rudolf Steiner's Campaign for a Self-Governing, Self-Managing, Self-Educating Society (published in English in 2017)
Michael Spence, After Capitalism
Edward Udell, A Curious Conversation about Social Threefolding
 Guenther Wachsmuth, Threefold Social Order (From The Basic Ideas of Rudolf Steiner on the Threefold Social Order). Anthroposophic Press, New York, 1920
Folkert Wilken (de), The Liberation of Capital
Folkert Wilken, The Liberation of Work

External links
Organizations
 Social Science Section at the Goetheanum, Switzerland
 Institute for Social Threefolding, Berlin
 Social Impulses - Initiative Network Threefolding, Stuttgart
 Centre for Associative Economics, UK

Articles and Resources
 The Whole Social, articles on current events and threefolding
 Owen Barfield Literary Estate, articles on threefolding
 Social Issues Section at the Rudolf Steiner Archive, an online e.Library
 Transforming Society, a distance-learning course on threefolding
 Overview of Societal Threefoldment
 LILIPOH, a quarterly magazine featuring occasional articles on anthroposophy and threefolding

Anthroposophy
Rudolf Steiner
Sociological theories
Social movements